ABVP is an acronym that may refer to:

American Board of Veterinary Practitioners
Akhil Bharatiya Vidyarthi Parishad, an Indian student organisation